Maciej Dreszer (born 27 March 1996 in Tarnów, Lesser Poland) is a Polish racing driver. Dreszer was the runner-up in the 2016 GT4 European Series.

Career
Dreszer started his racing career in 2012 in the Kia Lotos Race, the Polish based Kia Picanto Cup series. The 16-year old finished twelfth in the season standings, scoring three podium finishes. The following season Dreszer graduated into the Volkswagen Castrol Cup, the Polish based Volkswagen Golf Cup series. Dreszer again finished twelfth in the series.

For 2014 Dreszer joined Dörr Motorsport to race in the VLN Toyota GT86 Cup. Along with teammates Arne Hoffmeister and Fabian Wrabetz the team finished fourth in class at the famous Nordschleife in their first race. The team scored three class wins and won the series championship. The following season Dreszer joined Dutch driver Stephane Kox in the BMW M235i Cup Belgium. The team scored four victories at Circuit Zolder and Circuit de Spa-Francorchamps. For the 24 Hours of Zolder the duo was joined by experienced drivers Peter Kox, Jos Menten and Dennis Retera and dominated the race. Dreszer also placed second in the 24H Series Cup 1 class. 

Following his successful 2015 campaign the Polish driver was selected as Reiter Young Star, alongside Mads Siljehaug. The duo raced in the 2016 GT4 European Series. Winning one race, at Circuit Park Zandvoort, the team picked up a total of four podium finishes. The team secured second place at the final round in their KTM X-Bow.

Motorsports results

24 Hours of Zolder results

References

1996 births
Living people
People from Tarnów
Polish racing drivers
Nürburgring 24 Hours drivers
NASCAR drivers
24H Series drivers
GT4 European Series drivers